Artyom Aleksandrovich Smirnov (born 6 January 1989) is a Russian professional football player. He plays for FC Torpedo Vladimir.

Club career
He played 4 seasons in the Russian Football National League for FC Shinnik Yaroslavl, FC Tosno, FC Dynamo Saint Petersburg and FC Tyumen.

External links
 
 Player page by sportbox.ru
 

1989 births
Footballers from Yaroslavl
Living people
Russian footballers
Association football goalkeepers
FC Shinnik Yaroslavl players
FC Tosno players
FC Dynamo Saint Petersburg players
FC Tyumen players
FC Baltika Kaliningrad players
FC Tekstilshchik Ivanovo players
FC Chita players
FC Torpedo Vladimir players
Russian First League players
Russian Second League players